Kupwara Assembly constituency is one of the 87 constituencies in the Jammu and Kashmir Legislative Assembly of Jammu and Kashmir a north state of India. Kupwara is also part of Baramulla Lok Sabha constituency.

Overview 

Kupwara (constituency number 2) is one of the Vidhan Sabha constituencies located in Kupwara District. This constituency covers PCs 18-Sulakot, 20-Radabug, 22-Bumhama, 23-Drugmulla, 25-Gushi, 26-Batergam, 27-Dadikoot, 30-Gulgam, 31-Harrai, 32-Hayan, 33-Trehgam, 34-Guglose, 35-Kralpora, 36-Guzeryal, 37-Gundizona-Reshi. 38-Panzgam, 39-Meelyal, 40-Shooloora, 41-Dardihairi-Kharagund, 42-Kupwara, 43-Awoora, 44-Zirhama of Tehsil Kupwara and PC 55-Manzgam in Tehsil Handwara.

Member of Legislative Assembly

 1967: M. S. Tantray, Indian National Congress
 1972: G. H. Mohd, Indian  National Congress
 1977: Assad Ullah Shah, Jammu & Kashmir National Conference
 1983: Peer Abdul Gani, Jammu & Kashmir National Conference
 1987: Mushtaq Ahmed Lone, Jammu & Kashmir National Conference
 1996: Saifullah Mir, Jammu & Kashmir National Conference
 2002: Saifullah Mir, Jammu & Kashmir National Conference 
 2008: Saifullah Mir, Jammu & Kashmir National Conference

Election results

2014

See also
 Kupwara
 Kupwara district
 List of constituencies of Jammu and Kashmir Legislative Assembly

References

Assembly constituencies of Jammu and Kashmir
Kupwara district